Timothy Charles Coyle (born 22 July 1960) is a former Australian cricketer, who played first class cricket for Tasmania. He has been the coach of Tasmania since 15 June 2005.

After being a member of St Patricks College's state title winning team in 1977, Coyle was a consistent wicket-keeper who failed to cement a regular place in the side, although he did represent his home state seven times in the 1990–91 season. Following his retirement from playing, Coyle became a regional coach in his home town of Launceston before being appointed as the Tasmanian Cricket Association's game development manager in 2000, a position he held for five years, before becoming senior coach for Tasmania.

During his coaching reign, he successfully guided Tasmania to their first ever Pura Cup title, winning the competition in the 2006–07 season.

External links

1960 births
Living people
Australian cricketers
Tasmania cricketers
Cricketers from Launceston, Tasmania
Australian cricket coaches
Melbourne Renegades coaches
Wicket-keepers